Indonesia participated at the 2021 Southeast Asian Games in Hanoi, Vietnam from 12 to 23 May 2022. The Indonesian contingent consisted of 499 athletes, competing in 32 out 40 sports.

Medal summary

Medal by sport

Medal by date

Medalists

Archery

 
Recurve

 
Compound

Badminton

 
Men

 
Women

 
Mixed

Basketball

5x5 Basketball

Men's tournament

 
Roster
 
Indonesia men's 5x5 basketball final roster at SEA Games 2021
 

Group play(Round-robin)

Women's tournament

 
Roster
 
Indonesia women's 5x5 basketball final roster at SEA Games 2021

 
Group play(Round-robin)

3x3 Basketball

Men's tournament

 
Team roster
 Ibrahim Aziz
 Jamarr Andre Johnson
 Oki Wira
 Surliyadin
 
Group play

 

 
Semifinal

 
Bronze medal match

Women's tournament

 
Team roster
 Adelaide Wongsohardjo Calista
 Dewa Ayu Made Sriartha Kusuma Dewi
 Kimberley Pierre Louis
 Nathania Claresta Orville
 
Group play

 

 
Semifinal

 
Bronze medal match

Boxing

Cycling

 
Mountain

Road

Esports

CrossFire

Free Fire
Team Squad
 
 
Richard William Manurung
Ibnu Nasir Ramdani
Nur Ivaldi Fajar
Shahin Taskhir
Victor Innosensius
 
Muhammad Fikri Alief Pratama
Rahma Satria 
Agus Suparman
Rafli Aidil Fitrah
Raihan Maghfur
 
Group play

Mobile Legends: Bang Bang

PUBG Mobile
Individual

 
Team

Finswimming

Men

Women

Mixed

Football

Indonesia will only be participating in the men's tournament, sending a total of 20 players in Football and 14 players in Futsal.

Football

 

 
Team roster
Head coach:  Shin Tae-yong

OA Over-aged player 
 
Group play

 

 

 

 

 
Semifinal

 
Bronze medal match

Futsal

 
Team roster
Head coach:  Mohammad Hashemzadeh

 
Group play

Kickboxing 

 
Indonesia will be sending a total of 8 Kickboxer, 5 male and 3 female.
 
Full Contact
Men

 
Women

 
Low Kick
Men

 
Women

Pencak silat 

 
Seni

 
Tanding

Rowing

 
Men

 
Women

Volleyball

Men's tournament 

 
Roster

Women's tournament 

 
Roster

Weightlifting

 
Men

 
Women

Wushu

 
Taolu

 
Sanda

References

2022 in Indonesian sport
2021
Nations at the 2021 Southeast Asian Games